The United Party of Canada was a federally registered political party in Canada founded in October 2018. The party was deregistered by Elections Canada on December 31, 2020.

Ideology 
The party described itself as centre-left.

Election results

Leaders 
 Carlton Darby (2018–2020)

External links 
  — archived version of the party website, used from 2018 to 2020

References 

Federal political parties in Canada
Defunct political parties in Canada